Alonso René Zamora Barrera (born November 11, 1991) is a Mexican professional footballer who plays as a defender.

Zamora worked his way up the ranks of the Atlas youth system, before making his professional debut with Académicos in 2008, which at the time played in professional Primera Division A, on August 16, 2008.

Zamora made his first-team debut on June 21, 2009, for Atlas in the Superliga 2009 against the Kansas City Wizards. He came on as a sub in the 46th minute.

Honours
Tigres UANL
 Liga MX: Apertura 2015

References

1991 births
Living people
Footballers from Guadalajara, Jalisco
Liga MX players
Tigres UANL footballers
Atlante F.C. footballers
Association football defenders
Atlas F.C. footballers
Mexican footballers